The men's 110 metres hurdles event at the 1984 Summer Olympics in Los Angeles, California took place on 5 and 6 August 1984. Twenty-six athletes from 17 nations competed. The maximum number of athletes per nation had been set at 3 since the 1930 Olympic Congress. The event was won by Roger Kingdom of the United States, the nation's first championship since 1972 and 16th title in the event overall. Arto Bryggare's bronze was Finland's first medal in the men's high hurdles.

Background
This was the 20th appearance of the event, which is one of 12 athletics events to have been held at every Summer Olympics. Two finalists from 1980 returned: sixth-place finisher Arto Bryggare of Finland and seventh-place finisher Javier Moracho of Spain. The 1980 champion, Thomas Munkelt of East Germany, was kept out due to the Soviet-led boycott. World record holder Renaldo Nehemiah of the United States was also prevented from competing, because the IOC claimed "he had lost his amateur status" by playing professional football, an entirely different sport. The favorite therefore was 1983 World Champion Greg Foster of the United States, though as usual all of the American hurdlers were potential medalists. Bryggare had come in second at the world championships and was also a contender.

Algeria, the People's Republic of China, Paraguay, Samoa, and the United Arab Emirates each made their first appearance in the event; the Republic of China competed as "Chinese Taipei" for the first time. The United States made its 19th appearance, most of any nation (having missed only the boycotted 1980 Games).

Competition format
The competition continued to use the three-round format used since 1908 (except 1960, which had four rounds) and eight-man semifinals and finals used since 1964. The "fastest loser" system, also introduced in 1964, was not used as unnecessary for achieving the correct number of hurdlers advancing to the semifinals and final.

The first round consisted of four heats, with 6 or 7 hurdlers each. The top four hurdlers in each heat advanced to the semifinals. The 16 semifinalists were divided into two semifinals of 8 hurdlers each; the top four hurdlers in each advanced to the 8-man final.

Records

These were the standing world and Olympic records (in seconds) prior to the 1984 Summer Olympics.

Greg Foster equalized the standing Olympic record with 13.24 seconds; he and Roger Kingdom both matched that time in the semifinals as well. In the final, Kingdom set a new Olympic record with 13.20 seconds, with Foster also coming in under the old record (with 13.23 seconds).

Schedule

All times are Pacific Daylight Time (UTC-7)

Results

Round 1

Heat 1

Heat 2

Heat 3

Heat 4

Semifinals

Semifinal 1

Semifinal 2

Final

See also
 1980 Men's Olympic 110m Hurdles (Moscow)
 1982 Men's European Championships 110m Hurdles (Athens)
 1983 Men's World Championships 110m Hurdles (Helsinki)
 1984 Friendship Games 110m Hurdles (Moscow)
 1986 Men's European Championships 110m Hurdles (Stuttgart)
 1987 Men's World Championships 110m Hurdles (Rome)
 1988 Men's Olympic 110m Hurdles (Seoul)

References

External links
 Results
 Results
 Results

H
Sprint hurdles at the Olympics
Men's events at the 1984 Summer Olympics